A list of Portuguese films that were first released in 2019.

See also 

 2019 in Portugal

References 

Lists of Portuguese films by year
Lists of 2019 films by country or language
2019 in Portugal